WTAD 930 AM is a radio station broadcasting a news talk format. Licensed to Quincy, Illinois, the station is owned by STARadio Corporation.

WTAD carries a variety of local programming, as well as nationally syndicated shows such as  Laura Ingraham, Mark Levin, and Coast to Coast AM.

History

WTAD was first licensed on July 20, 1923, to Robert E. Compton and First Presbyterian Church in Carthage, Illinois. The call letters were randomly assigned from a sequential roster of available call letters. The station was deleted on December 18, 1923, then relicensed on July 8, 1925, to Robert E. Compton in Carthage, broadcasting at 1270 kHz, with a power of 50 watts.

In December 1926, the license was transferred to the Illinois Stock Medicine Broadcasting Corporation, and the station was moved to Quincy, Illinois and its power increased to 500 watts. In 1928, its frequency was changed to 1440 kHz, sharing time on the frequency with WMBD in Peoria. In 1935, the station's frequency was changed to 900 kHz, running 500 watts during daytime hours only. In 1936, the station's power was increased to 1,000 watts. In 1941, nighttime operations were added, running 1,000 watts with a directional array, and the station's frequency was changed to 930 kHz.

By 1941, the station had become an affiliate of the CBS Radio Network. In 1944, the station was sold to Lee Broadcasting for $487,500. In 1952, the station's daytime power was increased to 5,000 watts. In the 1970s and 1980s, the station aired a MOR format. By 1986, news-talk programming was added. In December 1986, the station was sold to Eastern Broadcasting, along with 99.5 WQCY, for $1.1 million. In 1989, Eastern Broadcasting was purchased by TMZ Broadcasting (later known as Tele-Media Broadcasting). In Spring 1994, the station's format was changed from soft AC to oldies.

In the fall of 1994, the station's format changed from full service/oldies to an all-talk format. In 1997, Tele-Media was purchased by Citadel. In 1997, the station's programming began to be simulcast on 106.7 WBRJ in Mount Sterling, Illinois. In 1998, the station was sold to STARadio Corporation. In 1999, the station's simulcast ended, after 106.7 was sold and switched to an oldies format as WLRT "Golden 106.7".

References

External links
WTAD's website

TAD
News and talk radio stations in the United States
Radio stations established in 1925
1925 establishments in Illinois